"Let's Try It Again" is a song performed by New Kids on the Block. Written and produced by Maurice Starr, it was the fourth and final single from the group's third album, Step by Step, released in the fall of 1990. It contains shared lead vocals by Danny Wood and Jordan Knight.

Reception
After having scored another big hit with the title track and its well-received top 10 follow-up "Tonight" from their number one album Step by Step, the group's momentum subsequently slowed down in the fall of 1990. Largely blamed on overwhelming media saturation, which included an animated cartoon series during the same period, a growing public and industry backlash against the group ensued. Upon the release of "Let's Try It Again", many radio stations rejected the song, while others quickly dropped it from their playlist after a few weeks. As a result, it became group's first single since 1986's "Stop It Girl" that failed to peak within the top 40 in the United States; peaking instead at number fifty-three.

Track listings
7" single
 "Let's Try It Again" – 3:51
 "Didn't I (Blow Your Mind)" – 4:24

Charts

References

1990 singles
New Kids on the Block songs
Columbia Records singles
Songs written by Maurice Starr
Song recordings produced by Maurice Starr
Pop ballads
Contemporary R&B ballads
1990 songs